The 2018–19 Telenet UCI Cyclo-cross World Cup was a season long cyclo-cross competition, organised by the Union Cycliste Internationale (UCI). The UCI Cyclo-cross World Cup took place between 23 September 2018 and 27 January 2019, over a total of nine events. The defending champions were Mathieu van der Poel in the men's competition and Sanne Cant in the women's competition.

Three of the five titles were secured at the penultimate round in France; with her fourth race victory, seven-time world champion Marianne Vos clinched her first World Cup title, leaving the round 132 points clear of her next closest competitor, compatriot Annemarie Worst. With his fourth win in five starts, British rider Tom Pidcock took the under-23 men's title for the second consecutive season – sealing a maximum possible points tally of 240 – while a second-place finish was enough for Belgium's Witse Meeussen to claim the junior men's title.

At the final event in the Netherlands, home rider Ceylin del Carmen Alvarado sealed the women's under-23 ranking victory, finishing in seventh place overall in the elite standings. The back-and-forth battle between Belgians Toon Aerts and Wout van Aert in the elite men standings was decided in the favour of Aerts – with 615 points, to van Aert's 613; the two riders took three victories between them as van der Poel won all six races he started in the World Cup season, finishing third overall.

Points distribution
Points were awarded to all eligible riders each race. The top ten finishers received points according to the following table:

 Elite riders finishing in positions 11 to 50 also received points, going down from 40 points for 11th place by one point per place to 1 point for 50th place.
 For the age group riders (excluding under-23 women), those finishing in positions 11 to 30 also received points, going down from 20 points for 11th place by one point per place to 1 point for 30th place. As well as this, only the top four scores for each rider count towards the World Cup standings.

Events
In comparison to last season, the races in Bogense, Nommay and Zeven were replaced by Bern, Pontchâteau and Tábor. The race in Bern will be the first Cyclo-cross World Cup race in Switzerland since the 2010–11 season.

Final points standings

Elite men

Elite women

Under-23 men

Under-23 women

Junior men

Notes

References

Sources

External links

World Cup
World Cup
UCI Cyclo-cross World Cup